Zhu Menghui (born 23 March 1999) is a Chinese swimmer. She competed in the women's 4 × 100 metre freestyle relay event at the 2016 Summer Olympics.

Personal bests

Long course (50-meter pool)

Short course (25-meter pool)

Key: NR = National Record ; AS = Asian Record

References

External links
 

1999 births
Living people
Olympic swimmers of China
Swimmers at the 2016 Summer Olympics
World Aquatics Championships medalists in swimming
Asian Games medalists in swimming
Asian Games gold medalists for China
Asian Games silver medalists for China
Swimmers at the 2018 Asian Games
Medalists at the 2018 Asian Games
Chinese female freestyle swimmers
Swimmers at the 2020 Summer Olympics
Medalists at the FINA World Swimming Championships (25 m)